Philippe Rousselet (born 7 July 1968) is a French film producer. He won the Academy Award for Best Picture for the 2021 American film CODA, a remake of the 2014 French film La Famille Bélier, which he had also produced.

Selected filmography 
 Marie from the Bay of Angels (1997)
 Serial Lover (1998)
 Folle d'elle (1998)
 Barney and His Little Annoyances (2001)
 Blanche (2002)
 Tristan (2003)
 Papa (2005)
 Lord of War (2005)
 The Do-Gooders (2005)
 One Fine Day (2006)
 The Key (2007)
 Crossfire (2008)
 The Women on the 6th Floor (2010)
 Source Code (2011)
 Larry Crowne (2011)
 Paris Manhattan (2012)
 Haute Cuisine (2012)
 Anything for Alice (2014)
 The Grad Job (2014)
 La Famille Bélier (2014)
 Dad in Training (2015)
 Bastille Day (2016)
 West Coast (2016)
 Radin! (2016)
 Two Is a Family (2016)
 How I Met My Father (2017)
 What Happened to Monday (2017)
 In and Out (2017)
 Promise at Dawn (2017)
 Photo de famille (2018)
 Rémi sans famille (2018)
 Small Country: An African Childhood (2020)
 The Lost Prince (2020)
 CODA (2021; co-won with Fabrice Gianfermi and Patrick Wachsberger)
 Hear Me Out (2021)
 Adieu Monsieur Haffmann (2021)

References

External links 

Living people
Year of birth missing (living people)
Place of birth missing (living people)
French film producers
Producers who won the Best Picture Academy Award